RAF Watnall was the operational headquarters of No. 12 Group, RAF Fighter Command at Watnall in Nottinghamshire, England.

History
The station was established during the Second World War in Spring 1940 to act as headquarters for No. 12 Group whose area encompassed the Midlands, Norfolk, Lincolnshire and North Wales. The Operations Centre of No. 12 Group was housed there in three buildings (Operations Room, Filter Room and Communications Centre), which were partially buried for protection, in a similar way to buildings for No. 9 Group RAF at RAF Barton Hall, No. 10 Group at RAF Box, No. 11 Group at RAF Uxbridge, No. 13 Group RAF at RAF Newcastle and No. 14 Group RAF at Raigmore House.
 
Operations room
The operations room, responsible for directing RAF aircraft in the No. 12 Group area, was located in a bunker on the east side of the main road in Watnall. It was fully operational by 1940 and closed in 1946. It is now flooded and the site above is now occupied by a vehicle testing centre.
 
Filter room
The Filter room, responsible for filtering large quantities of intelligence on enemy activity before it was passed to the operations room, was located in a bunker  further south on a sunken road off the main road in Watnall. It did not open until 1943. After the war it continued to be used as an early warning centre until it closed in 1961. The filter block was sold by auction in 2008 and is now being redeveloped as a hotel. An episode of The Restoration Man presented by George Clarke, which was aired on Channel 4 on 12 February 2014, described the progress of the development.
 
The Communications centre has not been found.

RAF units and aircraft

See also
 Battle of Britain
 List of Battle of Britain airfields
 List of Battle of Britain squadrons
 Watnall railway station

References

External links

Watnall
Watnall
Watnall